Volker Schmidt (born 22 September 1978 in Hamburg) is a German former football player who last played for Hamburger SV.

Career
Schmidt played in the youth side for Jahn Wilhelmsburg, HNT Hausbruch-Neugraben and HT 16 Hamburg. In summer 1991 left he HT 16 Hamburg and signed for Hamburger SV who was 2005 promoted to the seniorside On 28 May 2010 announced his retirement.

Coaching career
After his retirement will begin to work on 1 July 2010 as Assistant coach in the U-17 team by his last club Hamburger SV.

Personal life
Schmidt who was born in Hamburg grew up in Wilhelmsburg and Neu Wiedental, he marked his Abitur at Gymnasium Süderelbe in Hamburg-Harburg.

References

External links
 

Hamburger SV players
Hamburger SV II players
Bundesliga players
1978 births
Living people
Footballers from Hamburg
German footballers
Association football defenders